Donacaula rufalis is a moth in the family Crambidae. It was described by George Hampson in 1919. It is found in Kenya, Madagascar and Uganda.

References

Moths described in 1919
Schoenobiinae